Frederick Huth & Company was a British bank established in 1809, which became part of British Overseas Bank in 1936.

History
In 1809, Frederick Huth (1777-1864), a lutheran German-born British merchant, established the London merchant bank "Frederick Huth & Co".

Huth started speculating on his own account and acted as agent for other merchants. The business grew rapidly, specialising in trade with Germany, Spain and South America. Soon, Huth provided credits and advances to other merchants. By 1850 Huth was one of London's leading merchant banks. Following Frederick Huth's retirement in the 1850s, the bank was managed by Daniel Meinertzhagen (1801-1869), Frederick Huth's son-in-law and father of Richard Meinertzhagen (1878-1967). In 1867 Frederick Huth & Co was part of a consortium of leading London merchant banks which formed the "International Financial Society" to compete more effectively for mandates to make bond issues for European governments and infrastructure projects. In 1917 "Huth & Co" was founded in New York to undertake foreign exchange business.

In 1921 Huths encountered severe difficulties as a result of war losses on its continental acceptance business. The Bank of England took control of its affairs and in 1922 arranged a merger with Konig Brothers. In 1923 a new partnership was established, aided by a £2 million Bank of England loan. Huths, however, nerver fully recovered from its wartime losses. After its surviving banking business was transferred to the British Overseas Bank (est. 1919) in 1936, the firm was wound up. The British Overseas Bank in turn became part of the Royal Bank of Scotland in 1962.

References

NatWest Group
Defunct banks of the United Kingdom
Banks of the United Kingdom
Private banks
Banks established in 1809
Banks disestablished in 1936
Companies based in London
History of London
1809 establishments in England
Huth family